Robert Frederick Paulsen III (born March 11, 1956) is an American voice actor and voice director, known for his roles in numerous animated television series and films. He received a Daytime Emmy Award for Outstanding Performer in an Animated Program and three Annie Awards for his role as Pinky.

Early life
Rob Paulsen was born in Detroit, Michigan on March 11, 1956, the son of Bob and Lee Paulsen. He was raised in Grand Blanc, Michigan, where he graduated from Grand Blanc High School in 1974. He sang in choirs throughout his youth and adolescence and began performing in plays in school, but his childhood idol was ice hockey player Gordie Howe, and he considered the arts to be a secondary career choice due to his primary interest in becoming an NHL player. He briefly attended the University of Michigan-Flint, but later dropped out and moved to Los Angeles in 1978 to pursue a career in show business, much to the disapproval of his father.  He worked his first job as a musician, before pursuing voice acting full time.

Career
Paulsen first voice acting role came in 1983 with the mini-series G.I. Joe: A Real American Hero, where he played Snow Job and Tripwire. A few years later, his career launched into more roles such as Cobra Slavemaster and reprising Snow Job and "Tripwire" on G.I. Joe, Corky on The Snorks, Marco Smurf on the later seasons of The Smurfs, "Boober" on the animated version of Fraggle Rock, Hadji in The New Adventures of Jonny Quest and the title character Saber Rider and the villain Jesse Blue on Saber Rider and the Star Sheriffs.

During the 1980s, Paulsen also explored the field of live action films. His first movie was Eyes of Fire in 1983. He played supporting roles in Body Double, Stewardess School, Warlock, and Mutant on the Bounty. He appeared in television shows during this time as well, such as MacGyver and St. Elsewhere. 
Paulsen became more prevalent in the world of advertising as well. In the 1980s, he had been the announcer for the sitcom Cheers and continued to secure roles as an announcer. He appeared as the voice of Mr. Opportunity, spokesman of Honda commercials on TV and radio, the announcer for Buffalo Dick's Radio Ranch, and the spokesman for Lucky Stores, a West Coast grocery store chain, before it was acquired by Albertsons in 1998. He provided the voice of Dog in the Taco Bell kids meal commercials from 1996 to mid-1997, with Eddie Deezen as the voice of Nacho the cat.

However, Paulsen's most famous advertising role was in the original commercial of the now ubiquitous Got Milk? campaign. The famous commercial, Who shot Alexander Hamilton in that famous duel?, aired in 1993, and launched the Got Milk? campaign into a monstrously successful enterprise. Paulsen continues to be one of the most sought-after commercial voice actors in the industry. He can be currently heard as the voice of singing Mr. Mini-Wheat in the Mini-Wheats commercials in Canada.

From 1987 to 1995, Paulsen voiced Raphael and various supporting characters in the original 1987 Teenage Mutant Ninja Turtles series. Originally starting as a five-part miniseries, the series continued for ten seasons and 193 episodes. It was a great success and became an instant pop culture symbol. Paulsen has said that Raphael's voice is very similar to his natural voice.

He returned to the franchise as Donatello for the 2012 Teenage Mutant Ninja Turtles series on Nickelodeon, which ran for five seasons and 124 episodes from September 29, 2012, until November 12, 2017. He also reprised his role as 1987 Raphael in the multiple 1987/2012 crossover episodes.

Paulsen serves as the voice director for the subsequent series, Rise of the Teenage Mutant Ninja Turtles, which premiered in July 2018.

Throughout the early 1990s, Paulsen continued to co-star in animated series, which allowed him to branch further into radio and television announcements and dropped live action acting from his repertoire. In 1993, he voiced "Antoine Depardieu" in ABC's series Sonic the Hedgehog, and "Arthur", an insecure accountant in a moth costume (wings included), in the superhero series The Tick in 1995, replacing Micky Dolenz, who had originally played Arthur.

In 1993, he starred as the title character in both Mighty Max and The Mask. Also at this time, he starred in what became one of his most popular roles, Yakko Warner of Animaniacs. Paulsen also provided the voice of Pinky from  both Animaniacs and its spin-off Pinky and the Brain, a show which won him several Annie Awards and a Daytime Emmy in 1999. He also did a number of characters in Tiny Toon Adventures, including "Fowlmouth", "Arnold the Pit Bull", and "Concord Condor". In the direct-to-video movie Tiny Toon Adventures: How I Spent My Vacation, he did the voices for Banjo Possum, Mr. Hitcher (who would also appear in other episodes), and Johnny Pew.

Paulsen continues to voice Yakko and Pinky in the 2020 Animaniacs revival on Hulu.

Paulsen has also provided voices for numerous other characters, including Steelbeak in Darkwing Duck, Brick and Boomer in The Powerpuff Girls, Atchan in Hi Hi Puffy AmiYumi, Spooky the Tuff Little Ghost in The Spooktacular New Adventures of Casper, Ogden O. Ostrich in Channel Umptee-3, Hathi in Jungle Cubs, Jack Fenton, The Box Ghost, Nicolai Technus, and The Vulture Ghosts in Danny Phantom, Carl Wheezer, Butch and Skeet in The Adventures of Jimmy Neutron, Boy Genius, Mark Chang, his father King Grippulon, Happy Peppy Gary, and Bucky McBadbat in The Fairly OddParents, Peck the Rooster in Barnyard and Back at the Barnyard, and Gordon in Catscratch.

He was also the voice of Rothchild in the early episodes of Samurai Jack. Additionally, Paulsen provided the voice of P.J. Pete in Goof Troop, A Goofy Movie, and An Extremely Goofy Movie, as well as the voices of Ratchet and Dr. Debolt in the TaleSpin pilot episode and introductory TV movie Plunder & Lightning. He also did the voices of Boober Fraggle, Sprocket, and Marjory the Trash Heap in the animated version of Fraggle Rock, as well as Gwizdo in the Dragon Hunters movie.

He also voiced Zeek and Joshua in K10C: Kids' Ten Commandments, Rude Dog in Rude Dog and the Dweebs, and Archie the Raccoon, A.K.A. Ze Archer, in "Mask of the Raccoon" on The Penguins of Madagascar. and also provided the voices of 2T Fru-T and Mike Ellis in the 2001 cartoon series Butt-Ugly Martians.

He portrayed the voice of Chomper and Strut in The Land Before Time II: The Great Valley Adventure, Spike and Rinkus in The Land Before Time sequels and Spike in the TV series, but Spike was played anonymously in the original The Land Before Time. Paulsen also played Mo in The Land Before Time IX: Journey to Big Water. Paulsen also voiced the robot "D.E.C.K.S." in the early 1990s TV series Wake, Rattle, and Roll. Paulsen also voiced Prescott A. Wentworth III in the Jem episode The Fan. Paulsen also played Antoine Depardieu in Sonic the Hedgehog

Paulsen was best known to Transformers fans as the voices of the Autobots Air Raid, Chase, Haywire, Fastlane and Slingshot in The Transformers.

Paulsen has voiced characters in video games such as Doom 3. He played Fluffy the Chinese-crested dog in 102 Dalmatians: Puppies to the Rescue, an Irish pub landlord in the 1996 video game Toonstruck, and a floating talking skull named Morte in Planescape: Torment, as well as Anomen Delryn in Baldur's Gate II: Shadows of Amn and Gray Fox in Metal Gear Solid: The Twin Snakes and both Super Smash Bros. Brawl and Super Smash Bros. Ultimate as an Assist Trophy. He provided the voice for Erik the Swift of The Lost Vikings in its second installment. He portrayed Tobli and Lian Ronso in the English version of Square Enix's Final Fantasy X-2 and has played the lead character in Bubsy. Although an extremely minor role, Paulsen has also done the voice for the Greek soldiers in God of War. He voiced Jaq and The Grand Duke from the Cinderella world in Square Enix's and Disney's Kingdom Hearts Birth by Sleep.

In the video game The Nightmare Before Christmas: Oogie's Revenge, he did the voice of Igor. He also reprised his role as Yakko Warner, Dr. Otto Scratchansniff, and Pinky in Animaniacs: The Great Edgar Hunt. Rob Paulsen voiced the lead character, Lazarus Jones, in the PS2 game Ghosthunter. Rob also voiced Alfredo Fettuccini, Bob the Ghost Pirate, Lookout and Ghost Priest in The Secret of Monkey Island: Special Edition. He voiced the Fox and the Mouse in the Green Eggs and Ham PC game. He also voiced Tlaloc in Tak and the Power of Juju. He has voiced The Riddler in Lego Batman 2: DC Super Heroes, a role he reprised in Lego Batman: The Movie – DC Super Heroes Unite. Rob is the voice of talking alien dog Beak-Beak in Armikrog. Paulsen also voices Smash Hit in Skylanders: SuperChargers and Skylanders: Imaginators.

Paulsen is also the off-camera voice of the syndicated television series Funniest Pets & People, which is seen on Superstation WGN and other television stations throughout the United States and abroad.

It was not long before Paulsen returned to Warner Bros. Animation, which had diverged into a new era of television serials (following what is sometimes referred to as the "Silver Age of Animation"). Paulsen appeared as Rev Runner of the new show Loonatics Unleashed and starred in Coconut Fred's Fruit Salad Island. He was also the voice of the character Squeeky on the TV show Danger Rangers.  He voiced "Ichabeezer", Bacon Bill, Motato, Beau Rockley, Captain Mike, Tom Celeriac (a play on Tom Selleck), and other countless voices in VeggieTales in the House for Netflix.  Paulsen also provides the voice for the Honda character Mr. Opportunity. In the Rob Zombie animated film, The Haunted World of El Superbeasto, Paulsen voiced the characters "El Gato" and "Commandant Hess", among some others.  He also has a role as Ditto, one of the alien forms on Ben 10, as Rhomboid Vreedle of the Vreedle Brothers and Baz-El in Ben 10: Alien Force, two characters that he reprised, along with a new character, Magister Patelliday on Ben 10: Ultimate Alien  and Ben 10: Omniverse.

Beginning in 2001, Paulsen was the voice of Disney character José Carioca until he was succeeded by Eric Bauza in 2019. He became the new voice of Prince Eric of Disney's The Little Mermaid franchise beginning with the film The Little Mermaid II: Return to the Sea since Christopher Daniel Barnes failed to reprise the role in 2000, though Barnes did return to voice the character in the Kingdom Hearts series when Paulsen was unavailable. Another Disney character he is currently the voice of is Toodles from the kids show Mickey Mouse Clubhouse. From season 3, he voiced Toodles in the episodes "Happy Birthday Toodles", "Road Rally", and "Space Adventure", as well as every episode of season 4. He is also the voice of Peck the Rooster and other minor characters in the Nickelodeon computer-animated series Back at the Barnyard and various characters on the Disney Channel animated series The Replacements. He is the voice of Bobble in the Tinker Bell movies. Paulsen also played the titular character for an animated web series based on the video game Bravoman for Namco Bandai's ShiftyLook division.

Awards and nominations
Paulsen has been nominated for an Annie Award for his role of Pinky for 4 consecutive years, which he won in 1996, 1997, and 1999. In 1999, he also won the Daytime Emmy Award for voicing Pinky.

In 2004, he was nominated for his role of the Troubadour in Mickey, Donald, Goofy: The Three Musketeers, and in 2005, he was nominated for his role in The Happy Elf.

Public appearances

Paulsen has been a regular industry guest and featured panelist at San Diego Comic-Con International. He has also appeared at animation industry-related events, such as the World Animation Celebration Online in 1998, among many others. He has also been a guest at several anime conventions, including JACON, Mikomicon, and Anime Overdose. Paulsen was a guest of honor at Anthrocon in 2007. He has recently started doing "Rob Paulsen Live" seminars across the U.S. to talk of his career, sign autographs, and talk with fans. Sometimes, people in attendance would request him to sing the famous Yakko's World number, where he sings all the nations of the world with his Yakko voice in a fast-paced delivery without rehearsing.

In May 2011, working with social media and web producer Chris Pope, Paulsen rolled out a new website RobPaulsenLive.com, as well as a weekly audio podcast called Talkin' Toons with Rob Paulsen, which started out being managed and deployed by The Tech Jives Network, before moving to be part of Nerdist Industries' Nerdist Podcast Network.  Some episodes were recorded before a live audience at The Improv in Hollywood, California, while later ones were recorded at the Nerdist Showroom.  The show is on indefinite hiatus following the March 23, 2019 episode with Dante Basco.

In June 2011, Paulsen made announcements that he was taking his show on the road with his "Lots of laughs and autographs" tour. Working closely with a team that included Chris Pope, his publicist, and others he made his first successful tour in Atlanta, Georgia, which happened on July 30, 2011, and another in Dallas, Texas on September 17, 2011, that required two seminars, one in the afternoon and one in the evening, as they were so popular.

Personal life
He married his first wife, Carol Anne Schnarr on June 23, 1979. They divorced in 1982. 
He married his second wife, photographer Parrish Todd, in 1983. Together, they have a son. He lives in Agoura Hills, California with his family.

Paulsen has long supported various charities and raised donations for cancer research. He has worked a lot for GOALmodels, a program for adolescents, and is a sponsor of Camp Will-A-Way, a camp for children with developmental disabilities. He also donates funds from autographs to the Wounded Warrior Project and Operation Smile. In February 2016, he was diagnosed with stage III throat cancer. He has since undergone treatment and his cancer went in remission. Following his battle with cancer, he  wrote a memoir called Voice Lessons: How a Couple of Ninja Turtles, Pinky, and an Animaniac Saved My Life.

Filmography

Film

 101 Dalmatians II: Patch's London Adventure – Danny
 A Gnome Named Gnorm – Gnorm
 A Goofy Movie – P.J. Pete
 An Extremely Goofy Movie – P.J. Pete
 Aladdin and the King of Thieves – Additional voices
 Alvin and the Chipmunks Meet the Wolfman – Mr. Rochelle
 The Ant Bully – Beetle
 Balto II: Wolf Quest – Muru (singing voice), Terrier, Sumac, Wolverine #2
 Barnyard – Peck, Gopher, Pizza Twin #1
 Batman: Gotham Knight – Sal Maroni
 Batman and Harley Quinn – Harold Goldblum, Min & Max
 Batman: The Dark Knight Returns Part 2 – Rob
 Bat Thumb – No Face, Commissioner
 Beauty and the Beast: Belle's Magical World – LePlume, Right Oven Mitt
 Cathy – Irving Hillman
 Cathy's Last Resort – Irving Hillman
 Cathy's Valentine – Irving Hillman
 Cinderella II: Dreams Come True – Jaq, Grand Duke, The Baker, Sir Hugh, Bert, Flower Vendor
 Cinderella III: A Twist in Time – The Grand Duke, Jaq
 Charlotte's Web 2: Wilbur's Great Adventure – Farley, Mr. Arable
 Cranberry Christmas – Mr. Whiskers
 Curious George: A Very Money Christmas – Charkie, Mr. Reloj, Mr. Dulsen
 Curious George Swings Into Spring – Charkie
 Dragon Hunters – Gwizdo, Lensflair, Bat 1, Bat 2
 Elvira's Haunted Hills – Adrian
 The Fox and the Hound 2 – Chief
 The GodThumb – Mickey, Toll Booth Guard
 G.I. Joe: The Movie  – Snow Job
 Hamburger: The Motion Picture – Security Guard
 Happily N'Ever After – Amigo 2 (credited as Robert F. Paulsen III)
 The Happy Elf – Eubie
 The Haunted World of El Superbeasto – El Gato/Commandant Hess/Michael/Bobby Hyde/Grossburger/Creature Preacher
 Hoodwinked Too! Hood vs. Evil – Johann, Bad Shatner, Bad Kelley
 Holly Hobbie and Friends: Surprise Party – Gary Hobbie, Tad, Mr. Valcucci
 The Hunchback of Notre Dame – Frollo's Soldiers
 I'm Mad – Yakko Warner, Dr. Scratchansniff
 Jetsons: The Movie – Additional voices
 Jimmy Neutron: Boy Genius – Carl Wheezer, Ebenezer Wheezer, Martha Wheezer, Kid in Classroom
 Jonny's Golden Quest – Hadji
 Jonny Quest vs. The Cyber Insects – Hadji Singh / 425
 Lady and the Tramp II: Scamp's Adventure – Otis
 The Fairly OddParents: Fairy Idol – Bucky McBabbat, Government Agent 2, William Hung
 The Fairly OddParents: School's Out The Musical – Happy Peppy Gary
 The Happy Elf – Eubie, Turbo, Kid
 The Land Before Time II: The Great Valley Adventure – Spike / Strut, Chomper
 The Land Before Time III: The Time of the Great Giving – Spike / Kosh
 The Land Before Time IV: Journey Through the Mists – Spike
 The Land Before Time V: The Mysterious Island – Spike
 The Land Before Time VII: The Stone of Cold Fire – Rinkus, Spike
 The Land Before Time VIII: The Big Freeze – Spike, Stegosaurus Leader
 The Land Before Time IX: Journey to Big Water – Spike, Mo,
 The Land Before Time X: The Great Longneck Migration – Spike
 The Land Before Time XI: Invasion of the Tinysauruses – Spike, Kosh
 The Land Before Time XII: The Great Day of the Flyers – Spike, Mo, Guido, Kosh
 The Land Before Time XIII: The Wisdom of Friends – Spike, Beipiaosaurus #4
 The Land Before Time XIV: Journey of the Brave – Spike
 Lego Batman: The Movie – DC Super Heroes Unite – Riddler
 Leroy & Stitch – Reuben, Squeak, Additional voices
 The Little Mermaid II: Return to the Sea – Prince Eric
 The Little Mermaid: Ariel's Beginning – Ink Spot,  Swifty
 Looney Tunes: Rabbits Run' – Mac
 Lone Wolf McQuade – Man at festival
 Manou the Swift – Sandpipers
 Mannequin – Cop #4
 Mickey's Magical Christmas: Snowed in at the House of Mouse – Jaq
 Mickey, Donald, Goofy: The Three Musketeers – Troubadour
 Mickey's House of Villains – Hades (singing only)
 Mickey's Twice Upon a Christmas – Additional voices
 Mulan II – Prince Jeeki
 Otra Película de Huevos y un Pollo – Confi
 The Perfect Match – John Wainwright
 The Pirate Fairy – Bobble
 Pixie Hollow Games – Bobble, Buck
 Pocahontas II: Journey to a New World – Additional voices
 Porco Rosso – Additional voices
 The Powerpuff Girls Movie – Hota Wata, Killa Drilla, The Doot Da Doot Da Doo Doos , Blah-Blah Blah-Blah , Wacko Smacko 
 Return to Never Land – Pirates Rusty
 Rise of the Teenage Mutant Ninja Turtles: The Movie – Foot Lieutenant
 Rockin' with Judy Jetson – Sky Rocker
 Scooby-Doo! and the Reluctant Werewolf – Brunch
 Scooby-Doo! in Arabian Nights – Prince
 Scooby-Doo Meets the Boo Brothers – Shreako and Dispatcher
 Scooby-Doo! Music of the Vampire – Vampire Actor #2, the Sheriff, Teen Vampire
 Spaceballs – Soldier voices
 The SpongeBob Movie: Sponge Out of Water – Seagull
 Stitch! The Movie – Reuben
 Steel Magnolias – Delivery Guy
 Teacher's Pet – Ian Wazselewski
 The Powerpuff Girls Movie – Hota Wata, Blah-Blah Blah-Blah, Doot Da Doot Da Doo Doos, Wacko Smacko, Killa Drilla
 Tinker Bell – Bobble
 Tinker Bell and the Lost Treasure  – Bobble, Grimsley, Mr. Owl
 Tinker Bell and the Great Fairy Rescue – Bobble
 Tiny Toon Adventures: How I Spent My Vacation – Fowlmouth, Mr. Hitcher, Banjo the Woodpile Possum, Johnny Pew
 Secret of the Wings – Bobble
 Tiny Toon Adventures: How I Spent My Vacation – Fowlmouth, Johnny Pew, Mr. Hitcher, Banjo Possum, Hotel Manager and the Bike Carrier
 Tom and Jerry: Blast Off to Mars – Computer Voice, Worker #1, Worker #2
 Tom and Jerry: The Fast and the Furry – Irving, Dave
 Tom and Jerry and the Wizard of Oz – Hickory/Tin Man
 Tom and Jerry: Back to Oz – Hickory/Tin Man
 Top Cat and the Beverly Hills Cats – James, Lester Pester, Tour Bus Driver
 Tweety's High-Flying Adventure – Sphinx, Ship Crewman, Casino Cat, Additional Voices
 Wakko's Wish – Yakko Warner, Pinky, Dr. Otto Scratchansniff
 Yogi and the Invasion of the Space Bears – Zor Two
 Yogi the Easter Bear – Easter Bunny, Male Ranger

Television

 ABC Weekend Special – Spike Funnybunny, Moe Weasel, Policeman
 The Addams Family – Mr. Normanmeyer, Van Swash, Additional voices
 Adventures from the Book of Virtues – Peter, Classmate
 The Adventures of Jimmy Neutron: Boy Genius – Carl Wheezer, Butch, Ebenezer and Martha Wheezer, Eustace Strych, Additional voices
 Aladdin – Omar, Additional voices
 All Hail King Julien – Brodney, Captain Ethan, Lil Arms Magee, One Eyed Simon, Brendan the Butterfly, DJ, Narrator, Snake, Recorded Voice, Additional voices
 Alfred J. Kwak – Alfred Jodocus Kwak
 American Dragon: Jake Long – Groom, Additional voices
 The Angry Beavers – Terrence
 Animaniacs – Yakko Warner, Pinky, Dr. Otto von Scratchansniff, Additional voices
 Animaniacs (2020 TV series) – Yakko Warner, Pinky, Dr. Otto von Scratchansniff
 Angelica and Susie's Pre-School Daze – Plumber, Fireman, Clown
 Attack of the Killer Tomatoes – Mummato, Tomato Worm
 The Batman – Kid
 Batman: The Animated Series – Jay
 Back at the Barnyard – Peck, Bernard, Honest Earl, Skunky, Joey, Badger, Pizza Twin #1
 Ben 10 – Ditto, Monitor 2
 Ben 10: Alien Force – Baz-El, Rhomboid Vreedle, Alien Pilot, Patrolman, Cotton Candy Vendor
 Ben 10: Ultimate Alien – Baz-El, Rhomboid Vreedle, Magister Patelliday
 Ben 10: Omniverse – Magister Patelliday, Rhomboid Vreedle, Ditto, Captain Kork, Chadzmuth, Tummy Head, Gorvan, Phil, Gutrot
 Ben 10 (2016 TV series) – Clown 5, Bruce, Coach Keene
 Biker Mice from Mars – Throttle, Fred the Mutant, Additional voices
 Biker Mice from Mars (2006 TV series) – Throttle, Hairball, Additional voices
 The Blues Brothers Animated Series – Benny Fingers, Doctor
 Be Cool, Scooby-Doo! – Dave Mann, Donald, Father, Archibald
 Bonkers – Various
 The Boondocks (TV series) – The Art Teacher, Additional voices
 Brandy & Mr. Whiskers – Additional voices
 Bravoman – Bravoman, Alpha Man, Alphette, Additional voices
 Bubsy: What Could Possibly Go Wrong? – Bubsy Bobcat
 Bump in the Night – Squishington
 Butt-Ugly Martians – 2-T Fru-T, Mike
 Buzz Lightyear of Star Command – AP-06, Additional voices
 Can You Teach My Alligator Manners? – Al
 Capitol Critters – Additional voices
 The Spooktacular New Adventures of Casper – Spooky the Tuff Little Ghost
 CatDog – Hotdog, Hamburger (Meat, Dog's Friends), Additional voices
 Cathy – Irving
 Catscratch – Gordon, Additional voices
 Centerville – Mitch & Brad
 Challenge of the GoBots – Additional voices
 Channel Umptee-3 – Ogden Ostrich
 ChalkZone – Vinnie Raton, Walrus, Craniac
 Chip 'n Dale Rescue Rangers – Captain Finn, Flash The Wonder Dog, Chief Marley, Shakabaka, Darby Spree
 Chowder – VG, Dom, Additional voices
 Coconut Fred's Fruit Salad Island – Coconut Fred
 Codename: Kids Next Door – Rupert Puttkin/The Great Puttinsky, Shaunie Fulbright, Robin Food, Mr. Mogle, Additional voices
 The Crow: Stairway to Heaven – James
 Curious George – Compass, Charkie, Mr. Glass, Mr. Reloj, Additional voices
 Dan Dare: Pilot of The Future – The Mekon
 Danger Rangers – Squeaky, Snarf, Additional Voices
 Danny Phantom – Jack Fenton, Nicolai Technus, The Box Ghost
 Darkwing Duck – Steelbeak
 Dave the Barbarian – Malsquando, Additional voices
 Denver, the Last Dinosaur – Nick, Chet, Scott, Morton's Henchmen
 Detention – Uncle Kelly
 Dexter's Laboratory – Major Glory, Puppet Pal Mitch, Additional voices
 Dino-Riders – Faze, Kameelian
 Disney's Adventures of the Gummi Bears – Gusto Gummi
 Disney's House of Mouse – José Carioca
 Disney's Sheriff Callie's Wild West – Tricky Travis
 Doc McStuffins – Sir Kirby, Townspeople
 Duck Dodgers – Mac Gopher, Porko, Captain Peters, Axl Gator
 DuckTales – Gladstone Gander
 DuckTales (2017 TV series) – Gibbous, Restaurant Host
 El Tigre: The Adventures of Manny Rivera – Additional voices
 Elena of Avalor – Macoco
 Eloise: The Animated Series – Bill
 The Fairly OddParents –  Mark Chang, Happy Peppy Gary, King Gripullon, Bucky McBadbat, Mr. Ed Ledly, Additional voices
 Fish Hooks – Magic Hamster Mirror, Additional Voices
 Fish Police – Richie
 The Flintstone Kids – Additional voices
 Foofur – Additional Voices
 Fraggle Rock: The Animated Series – Boober Fraggle, Additional voices
 Freakazoid! – Yakko Warner, George Takei, Officer Mohammed Abdul, Pinky, Francois, Lord Bravery Singers
 Fresh Beat Band of Spies – Nutty Nuts, Walnut
 Gargoyles – Helios
 Gary the Rat – Additional voices
 Generator Rex – Providence Agent Jackson, Providence Tech, Additional voices
 "The George Lucas Talk Show" – Self, episode: Streamers of the Lost Art (of Conversation)
 G.I. Joe: A Real American Hero (1985 TV series)  – Snow Job, Tripwire, Flash (ARAH), World War I American Warrior, Cobra slavemaster
 Goof Troop – P.J. Pete, Additional voices
 Gravity Falls – Additional Voices
 The Greatest Adventure: Stories from the Bible – Moki
 Green Eggs and Ham – Little Snerz, Pool Shark
 Green Lantern: The Animated Series – Goggan, Bumpy
 The Grim Adventures of Billy & Mandy – Tooth Fairy, Additional voices
 Half-Shell Heroes: Blast to the Past – Donatello, Additional Voices
 Half-Shell Heroes: Blast to the Past – Donatello, Triceraton Lieutenant
 Handy Manny – Eddie
 Harvey Birdman, Attorney at Law – Baba Looey, Kids, Announcer
 Henry Hugglemonster – Denzel Dugglemonster
 Higglytown Heroes – Barber Hero
 Hi Hi Puffy AmiYumi – Freddy, Atchan, Additional voices
 The High Fructose Adventures of Annoying Orange – Broccoli Alien Overlord, Marshmallow Warriors, Dr. Sigmund Fruit, Dr. Fruitenstein, Thomas Jefferson, Rock, Apricot, President Dane, Junior, Sour Grapes, Green Apple
 Histeria! – Mr. Smartypants, Sammy Melman, Additional voices
 House of Mouse – José Carioca, Panchito Pistoles (singing voice in the episode, "Not So Goofy!")
 I Am Weasel – Stevie, Admiral Algebra Doll
 It's Pony – Noodleneck Ned
 Jackie Chan Adventures – Magister #2, Punk Magister
 Jake and the Never Land Pirates – Grandpa Bones
 Jem – Prescott A. Wentworth III
 The Jetsons – Gus Guesser, Blinky "Boy Boy Nova" Sunspot, Hall Monitor
 Johnny Bravo – Green Swoosh, Additional Voices
 Jungle Cubs – Hathi, Akela, Additional voices
 Justice League – Lightray
 K10C: Kids' Ten Commandments – Zeek, Josephat, Joshua
 Kim Possible – François, Prince Wally, Dallas, Hank Perkins, Additional voices
 Kung Fu Panda: Legends of Awesomeness – Han Sr.
 The Land Before Time – Spike/Ruby's Father/Angry Apatosaurus #1/Hidden Runner/Mo/Milo/Stegosaurus Leader/Guido/Lambeosaurus The Legend of Prince Valiant – Robert Draconarius, Prince Edwin, Soldier
 The Legend of Tarzan – Radio Voice
 Lego Star Wars: The Padawan Menace – Commander Cody, Bobby, George Lucas
 The Life and Times of Juniper Lee – 10th Level Warlock, Leonard the Goblin, Additional voices
 Lilo & Stitch: The Series – Reuben, Squeak, Houdini, Frenchfry, Forehead, Lax, Manny, Wishy-Washy, Additional voices
 Lilly the Witch – Hektor (Season 3)
 Loonatics Unleashed  – Rev Runner, Gorlop, Mr. Leghorn (2nd Time), Additional voices
 The Looney Tunes Show – Mac Gopher, Chuck Berost, Cashier
 The Loud House – Lane Loud (S1E23A), Mrs. Coconuts (S1E23A), Senior Announcer, Seymour
 Mad – Lex Luthor, Various
 The Magician – Cosmos, Sonny Boy
 The Mask: Animated Series – Stanley Ipkiss/The Mask
 Megas XLR – V'arsin
 Mickey and the Roadster Racers – José Carioca (2017–2018)
 Mickey Mouse – Referee
 Mickey Mouse Clubhouse – Toodles
 Mickey Mouse Works – José Carioca
 Midnight Patrol: Adventures in the Dream Zone – Nightmare Prince
 The Mighty B! – Additional voices
 Mighty Ducks – Shecky 'The Comedian' Carter, Dr. Swindle
 Mighty Max – Mighty Max
 Mighty Magiswords – Professor Cyrus, Botticelli the Tortoise, Weather Gnome, Mr. Tundrala
 Mrs. Munger's Class – Rock and Lance
 My Friends Tigger & Pooh – Raccoon
 My Life as a Teenage Robot – Additional voices
 The New Adventures of Jonny Quest – Hadji
 New Kids on the Block – Wildcat
 The New Woody Woodpecker Show – Corky, Louie, Woody Clone, Willy Walrus, Günther
 The New Yogi Bear Show – La Bamba Bear
 Oh Yeah! Cartoons – Mother Goose, Home Owner
 Ozzy & Drix – Travis Lum, Backseat, Chief Maximus, Additional voices
 The Penguins of Madagascar – Ad Executive #1, Technician, Archie the Raccoon, Stockbroker, Guy #1, Stockbroker #1, Scout #1, Lobster #1, Kid Kazoo
 Pepper Ann – Larry, Danny
 Phantom 2040 – Sean One, Heisenberg, Additional voices
 Phineas and Ferb – TV Scientist, Additional voices
 Pinky and the Brain – Pinky, Yakko Warner, Romy, Dr. Otto von Scratchansniff
 Pinky, Elmyra & the Brain – Pinky
 Pig Goat Banana Cricket – Early Bird, Cousion Eel, Hands, Additional voices
 Planet Sheen – Doppy Dopweiler, Globar, Hajingy, Chock Chock, Additional voices
 The Plucky Duck Show – Mr. Bughari, Furrball, Additional voices
 Poochini's Yard – Additional Voices
 Pound Puppies – King (AKA No-Name) (uncredited)
 Pound Puppies (2010 TV series) – Pet Delivery Guy, Suds, Yakov
 The Powerpuff Girls – Brick, Boomer, Additional voices
 Power Eons: Super Legends – Demeon (Ninja Storm)
 ProStars – Additional voices
 Puss in Boots – Basil
 A Pup Named Scooby-Doo – Professor Digby/Were-Doo
 Quack Pack – Nigel Nightshade
 Random! Cartoons – Solomon Fix, Danny, Tickle Monster, Handycat, Drillbit, Flavio
 Randy Cunningham: 9th Grade Ninja – Jacques
 The Real Adventures of Jonny Quest – Hadji, Additional voices
 The Replacements – Phil Mygrave, Fabian Le'Tool, Mr. Vanderbosh, Dr. Scorpius, Additional voices
 Regular Show – Additional voices
 Rick and Morty – Snuffles/Snowball
 Rick + Morty in the Eternal Nightmare Machine – Snuffles/Snowball
 Road Rovers – Wolf King, Katzenstoki Ambassador, Gas Station Attendant
 Roary the Racing Car – Additional Voices (US)
 Robot Chicken – Garbage Sushi, Jesus, Dinosaur Train Singer, Little Match Girl's Father
 Robot and Monster – Bob, Scale
 Rocko's Modern Life – Additional voices
 Rude Dog and the Dweebs – Rude Dog, Additional voices
 Saber Rider and the Star Sheriffs – Saber Rider, Jesse Blue
 Sabrina: The Animated Series – Uncle Zamboni
 Samurai Jack – Rothchild, Additional voices
 Savage Dragon – Octopus
 Scooby-Doo! Ghastly Goals – Julio
 Scooby-Doo! Mystery Incorporated – Winslow Fleach, Radio Newsman
 Scruff – the Rats
 The Secret Saturdays – Baron Finster, Car Driver, Yachstman
 Slimer and the Real Ghostbusters – Robby, Additional Voices
 The Smurfs – Marco Smurf, Additional voices
 TUGS — Ten Cents, Zorran, Zak (Only in test US dub)
 Snorks – Corky
 Sonic the Hedgehog – Antoine Depardieu
 South Park – Additional voices
 Space Cats – Thomas 'Tom' Spacecat, Chelsie Pipshire
 Spider-Man – Morris Bench / Hydro-Man
 Squirrel Boy – Rodney J. Squirrel (pilot)
 Star vs. the Forces of Evil – Gustav / Charlie Booth
 Stripperella – Carl, Milton Gibbs
 SpongeBob SquarePants – Glove World officer (Episode: "Escape from Beneath Glove World"; uncredited)
 Disney's The Emperor's New School – Overachiever's Club Member
 The Super Hero Squad Show – Werewolf by Night, Baron Strucker
 The Little Troll Prince: A Christmas Parable – Prince Borch
 Super Secret Secret Squirrel – Anteater, Snooper and Blabber
 SWAT Kats: The Radical Squadron – Hard Drive, Al
 The Sylvester & Tweety Mysteries – Mechanic, Dussel, Hephaestus, Stanley Coop, Farmer Boyer
 Tak and the Power of Juju – Party Juju, Judge Juju, Gillbert
 TaleSpin (Plunder & Lightning) – Ratchet, Dr. Debolt
 Tasty Time with ZeFronk – Frankie "ZeFronk"
 Taz-Mania – Digeri Dingo, Francis X. Bushlad, Axl Gator, Timothy Platypus, Marvin the Martian
 Teacher's Pet – Ian Wazselewski
 Teenage Mutant Ninja Turtles – Raphael, Donatello
 1987 – Raphael, Zach the Fifth Turtle, Wingnut, HiTech, The Grybyx, Mister Ogg, Professor Sopho, Tokka, Additional voices
 2012 – Donatello, Speed Demon Donnie, Metalhead, 80's Raphael, Shopkeeper, Cat Owner, Other Guy, Sir Paul, Triceraton Pilot, Sumo Glen, Triceraton Commander, Additional voices
 Rise of the Teenage Mutant Ninja Turtles – Foot Lieutenant, Teem Customer
 Teen Titans – The Source, Quiz Monkey Host, Stunt Show Host
 The Upside Down Show – Cactus
 ThunderCats – Shen, Rezard
 The Tick (1994 TV series) – Arthur (Season 2 and Season 3), Brainchild (1st Time), Crusading Chameleon, Captain Mucilage, The Forehead, The Terror
 Tigger & Pooh and a Musical, Too – Raccoon
 The Jimmy Timmy Power Hour series – Carl Wheezer, Additional voices
 The Transformers – Air Raid, Chase, Fastlane, Slingshot
 This Just In! – Jimmy Fallon
 Time Squad – Buck Tuddrussel
 Timon & Pumbaa – Banzai, Cheetata
 Timeless Tales from Hallmark – Runabout, Duckling 3, Crocodile 2
 Tiny Toon Adventures – Arnold the Pitbull, Banjo the Woodpile Possum, Blink Winkleman, Concord Condor, Cooper DeVille, Fowlmouth, Foxy, Sneezer's Dad, Peter Hastings, Vanilla Lice, Beaky Buzzard, Furrball
 Tiny Toons: Spring Break – Beaver
 Tom & Jerry Kids – Additional voices
 Totally Spies – Diminutive Smalls (Season 1), Asian guard
 TripTank – John, Groom, Dad
 T.U.F.F. Puppy – Bird Brain, Additional voices
 Ultimate Spider-Man – Batroc the Leaper, Boomerang, Additional voices
 Wake, Rattle, and Roll – D.E.C.K.S
 The Weekenders – Cousin Phillip, Carl, Sid, Murph, Nonno
 What a Cartoon! – Cop, Pigeon, Yoink, Additional voices
 What's New, Scooby-Doo? – Avery Orenthal, Government Agent, Jamison Steven Ripley, Travis Knox
 Where's Wally?: The Animated Series – Additional voices
 Wild West C.O.W.-Boys of Moo Mesa – Cacklin' Kid
 Wildfire – Additional voices
 The Wizard of Oz – Additional voices
 Yo Yogi! – Dick 'Dickie' Dastardly, Chuck Toupee, Super Snooper, Robin Hood, Waiter, Wee Willie the Gorilla, Additional voices
 VeggieTales – Mr. Finnegan J. Beet
 VeggieTales in the House – Ichabeezer, Bacon Bill, Junior's Dad, Tom Celeriac, Additional voices
 Tree Fu Tom – Twigs

Video games

 Animaniacs Game Pack – Yakko Warner, Pinky, Dr. Otto Scratchansniff
 Animaniacs: The Great Edgar Hunt – Yakko Warner, Pinky, Dr. Otto Scratchansniff
 Animaniacs: Ten Pin Alley – Yakko Warner, Pinky, Dr. Otto Scratchansniff
 102 Dalmatians: Puppies to the Rescue – Fluffy
 Armed and Dangerous – Captain 2, Grunt, Kato
 Armikrog – Beak-Beak, PresidANTs
 Baldur's Gate – Kivan, Volo, Prism, Telmen
 Baldur's Gate II – Shadows of Amn – Anomen Delryn,  Saerk Farrahd,  Biff the Understudy, Qadeel
 Barnyard – Peck
  Ben 10 Alien Force: Vilgax Attacks – Rhomboid Vreedle
  Ben 10: Omniverse – Rhomboid Vreedle
  Ben 10: Galactic Racing – Rhomboid Vreedle
  Ben 10 Ultimate Alien: Cosmic Destruction – Rhomboid Vreedle
 Biker Mice from Mars – Throttle, Hairball, Claw Tooper
 Blazing Dragons – Mervin the Magician, Inventor of Baseball
 Bubsy 2 – Bubsy Bobcat
 Bubsy in Fractured Furry Tales – Bubsy
 Butt-Ugly Martians: Martian Boot Camp – 2T Fru-T
 Butt-Ugly Martians: Zoom or Doom! – 2T Fru-T, Chitzok
 Catscratch – Gordon Quid
 Cedric's Basics In Education & Learning – Cedric Cat
 ClayFighter 63⅓ – Bonker
 Doom 3 – Research Director Larry Bullman
 The Fairly OddParents: Breakin' da Rules – King Gripploun, Dog Catcher, Fairy Judge, Guard, Anti-Fairies, Squirrelly Scouts, Arthur, Gilded Arches
 The Fairly OddParents: Shadow Showdown – Mark Chang, Oberon, Quince, Ape King, Chamberlain, The Shadow
 Final Fantasy X-2 – Tobli, Additional voices
 FusionFall – Major Glory
 Ghosthunter – Officer Lazarus Jones
 Giants: Citizen Kabuto – Timmy the Smartie
 God of War – Greek Soldier
 The Incredibles: Rise of the Underminer – The Crustodian
 Jimmy Neutron: Boy Genius – Carl Wheezer, Yokian Fleet Commander, Yokian 1, Yokian 2, Yokian 3, Retroland Worker, Ultra-Lord (PC Version only)
 Jimmy Neutron vs. Jimmy Negatron – Carl Wheezer, The Herminator, Sporko's Employee, Sparko's Owner
 Kingdom Hearts Birth by Sleep – Jaq, Grand Duke
 Lego Batman 2: DC Super Heroes – Riddler
 Lost Odyssey – Technician Amures
 Metal Gear Solid: The Twin Snakes – Gray Fox (English dub)
 Metal Gear Solid: Portable Ops  – NULL (English dub)
 Nickelodeon Toon Twister 3D – Carl Wheezer
 Nickelodeon Kart Racers 3: Slime Speedway – Raphael 
 Orion Burger – Wilbur Wafflemeier
 PK: Out of the Shadows – PK
 Planescape: Torment – Mortimer 'Morte' Rictusgrin
 Return to Monkey Island – Bob, The Lookout
 Sacrifice – Zyzyx
 Samurai Jack: Battle Through Time – Rothchild
 Scooby-Doo 2 Monsters Unleashed: The Video Game – Black Knight, Cotten Candy Glob, Miner 49er, Doorbell
 The Secret of Monkey Island: Special Edition – Bob, The Lookout, Alfredo Fettucini
 Skylanders: SuperChargers – Smash Hit
 Skylanders: Imaginators – Smash Hit
 Teacher's Pet – Ian Wazselewski
 The Sopranos: Road to Respect – Gil
 SpongeBob SquarePants featuring Nicktoons: Globs of Doom – Technus, Carl Wheezer, Traloc
 Star Wars Rogue Squadron II: Rogue Leader – Rebel Wingman 7, Slave
 Star Wars: Galactic Battlegrounds – Captain Tarpals, Gungan Villager 1
 Snort – Chuckle, Snort
 Stupid Invaders – Male Robot
 Super Smash Bros. Brawl – Gray Fox
 Super Smash Bros. Ultimate – Gray Fox
 Tak: The Great Juju Challenge –  Dead Juju, Head 2, Tlaloc
 Tak and the Power of Juju – Tlaloc, Head 2, Dead Juju
 Tak 2: The Staff of Dreams – Tlaloc, Dead Juju, Giant  Misunderstanding Juju
 The Fairly OddParents: Breakin' da Rules – King Grippulon, Gilded Arches, Guard, Fairy Judge, Anit-Fairys, Arthur, Squirrly Scouts, Dog Catcher
  The Fairly OddParents: Shadow Showdown – Mark Chang, Oberon, Quince, Ape King, Chamberlain, The Shadow
 The Lion King: Simba's Mighty Adventure – Banzai
 Teenage Mutant Ninja Turtles video games – Raphael, Donatello
 Nickelodeon's Teenage Mutant Ninja Turtles – Donatello
 Portal Power – Donatello, 80's Raphael
 Turtles in Time – Raphael
 Danger of the Ooze – Donatello
 Shredder's Revenge – Raphael
 The Secret Sundays: Beasts of the 5th Sun – Baron Finster
 Toonstruck – Lugnut, Mee, Barman

Live-action
 Big Time Rush – C.A.L. (uncredited), Parrot, Sam Selmart
 Body Double – Cameraman
 Changeland – Dad
 Comic Book: The Movie – Himself
 Eyes of Fire – Jewell Buchanan
 Funniest Pets & People – Announcer (voice)
 I Know That Voice – Himself
 Hamburger: The Motion Picture – Security Guard
 MacGyver – Rogers
 Rosie – Texry "Hee Haw" Rose (13 episodes)
 Stewardess School – Larry Falkwell
 St. Elsewhere – Ryan S. Hope
 The Perfect Match – John Wainwright
 Warlock – Gas Station Attendant

Internet
 Bravoman – Bravoman, Alpha Man, Himself, Additional Voices
 Sock Puppet Theatre – Various Voices
 Nostalgia Critic – Himself, Pinky
 Nickelodeon Animation Podcast – Himself (Episode 13, 35, 41)
  Demo Reel  – Himself
 Speech Bubble – Himself

Theme parks
 Jimmy Neutron's Nicktoon Blast (2003) – Carl Wheezer
 Gran Fiesta Tour Starring The Three Caballeros'' (2007) – José Carioca

Commercials
 Aliens – Hicks
 American Honda Motor Company – Mr. Opportunity (2004–2011)
 Got Milk? – Radio Announcer
 Haribo – Narrator (Gold Bear Land)
 Taco Bell – Dog
 Tamagotchi – Fish

References

External links

 
 Rob Paulson website on Archive.org
 Rob Paulsen at SBV Talent
 Rob Paulsen Talkin' Toon Live Weekly Video Podcast on Ustream
 
 Rob Paulsen at Voice Chasers

1956 births
Living people
American male film actors
American male television actors
American male video game actors
American male voice actors
American people of Danish descent
American podcasters
American voice directors
Annie Award winners
Audiobook narrators
Daytime Emmy Award winners
Disney people
Hanna-Barbera people
Male actors from Detroit
Male actors from Los Angeles
People from Genesee County, Michigan
University of Michigan–Flint alumni
20th-century American male actors
21st-century American male actors